The Sarpay Beikman Manuscript Awards are annual literary awards given in Burma by the Sarpay Beikman (Palace of Literature), a department of the Ministry of Information. They are awarded for unpublished manuscripts in various fiction and non-fiction categories. Sarpay Beikman publishes the winning entries, as well as giving a financial prize. The awards complement the Burma National Literature Award and the privately sponsored Sayawun Tin Shwe Award, Pakokku U Ohn Pe literary award, Thuta Swesone literary award and Tun Foundation award.

Background

The Burmese Translation Society began to present the Sarpay Beikman Awards (K. 1000) in 1949. They were renamed the Literary Fine Art Awards in 1962 and the National Literary Awards in 1965.
The awards were presented to authors who submitted manuscripts in categories such novel, translation, general literature, general knowledge, short story, poems, and dramas. The prizes were awarded annually, and the manuscripts published.
Entries had to comply with five general principles: the works must support or at least agree with the ruling party aims, foster Burmese culture, promote patriotism, help build character and advance ideas and contribute useful knowledge.
A first, second and third prize was awarded in each category where there were suitable entries, which was not always the case.

From 1970 a new system was started. Unpublished works were submitted in competition for the Sarpay Beikman Manuscript Awards.
However, the National Literary Awards, one per category, were selected from books that had been published in the previous year.
Although 12 awards could be given, the selection committee usually chose fewer, since it is often not possible to find a publication that meets the guidelines, particularly in the "novel" category.
In recent years the genres covered by Sarpay Beikman Manuscript and National Literary Awards have been gradually extended and the number of awards increased.
Relatively few translators are honored. In 2008 no translation prize was given at all.
This may in part be due to financial constraints, in part to censorship and interference in what is translated by the military regime.

Awards by year

1955 awards

 Saya Zawgyi, Variety in literature category, for 
 Journal Kyaw Ma Ma Lay,  (Not Out of Hate)

1957 awards
 Ludu U Hla  (ထောင်နှင့်လူသား) - Prison and Man

1959 awards

 Tin Moe, Poetry:  (The Lantern)

1961 awards
 Khin Hnin Yu,  (	ကြေးမုံရိပ်သွင် ဝတ္ထုတိုများ) Mirror Image-Like Short Stories

1963 awards
Sayawun Tin Shwe, General Knowledge (literature)
 Journal Kyaw Ma Ma Lay,  (A Slow Stream of Thoughts and Burmese Medicine Tales)

1964 awards
 Ludu Daw Amar, Literature on Burmese Culture and Arts:  - Artistes that People Loved 1964

1990 awards
The winner of the 1990 awards were announced on November 22, 1991: In some cases no prize was awarded (e.g. no first prize, but a second or third prize),  The winners were:

2000 awards
Winners of the 2000 awards were announced on 25 November 2001. They were:

2003 awards
The 2003 award presentation ceremony was held at the National Theatre on Myoma Kyaung Street in Yangon on 12 December 2004.
Secretary-1 of the State Peace and Development Council Lt-Gen Thein Sein opened his address by saying "at a time when the State is doing all it can to build up a peaceful, modern and developed nation, it is also striving not only for physical infrastructural development of the country but also for enhancement of national literature for mental development of the people".
Secretary-1 presented the Life-long National Literary Award to writer U Htay Maung.
Sarpay Beikman Manuscript Awards given for works submitted in 2003 were:

2005 awards

Awards for 2005 were presented at a ceremony at Nay Pyi Taw city hall on 30 January 2007.
Secretary-1 of the State Peace and Development Council Lt-Gen Thein Sein addressed the attendees.
The Secretary-1 gave the Lifetime Achievement National Literary Award for 2005 to Daw Yin Yin (Saw Monnyin) and presented nine other National Literary prizes in different categories.
Winners of the Sarpay Beikman Manuscript awards were:

No manuscript won an award the political literary genre.

2007 awards

The 2007 awards were given out at a ceremony on 28 December 2008 at the Ministry of Information in Nay Pyi Taw.
Later the Minister  for Information Brig-Gen Kyaw Hsan hosted a dinner in honor of the life-time achievement literary award and Sarpay Beikman manuscript award winners for 2007 at the Shwenantaw Hotel of Nay Pyi Taw. Minister for Labour U Aung Kyi attended the dinner.
First prize winners were:

2008 awards

The 2008 awards were presented at a ceremony at the Ministry of Information on 31 December 2009.
Secretary-1 of the State Peace and Development Council General Thiha Thura Tin Aung Myint Oo addressed the attendees.
He presented the Life-Time Achievement National Literary Award to doyen literati Sayagyi Dr Kyaw Sein.
First prize winners of Sarpay Beikman Manuscript Awards were:

2009 awards

The 2009 Life-time Achievement for National Literary Award, National Literary Award and Sarpay Beikman Manuscript Award presentation ceremony was held in the hall of the Ministry of Information on 31 December 2010.
The attendees heard an address by Secretary-1 of the State Peace and Development Council Thiha Thura U Tin Aung Myint Oo.
Winners of Sarpay Beikman Manuscript Awards for 2009 included:

2010 awards

2011 awards

2012 awards

The 2012 Life-time Achievement for National Literary Award, National Literary Award and Sarpay Beikman Manuscript Award presentation ceremony was held at the National Theatre, Yangon on 3 December 2013. Winners of Sarpay Beikman Manuscript Awards for 2012 were:

2013 awards

The 2013 Life-time Achievement for National Literary Award, National Literary Award and Sarpay Beikman Manuscript Award presentation ceremony was held at the National Theatre, Yangon on 22 November 2014. Winners of Sarpay Beikman Manuscript Awards for 2013 were:

References

Burmese literary awards
Translation awards